Asian Handball Championship may refer to:
 Asian Men's Handball Championship
 Asian Women's Handball Championship